Morula (Habromorula) spinosa, common name : the spinose rock shell, is a species of sea snail, a marine gastropod mollusk in the family Muricidae, the murex snails or rock snails.

Description

Distribution
This species is distributed in the Red Sea, in the Indian Ocean along Aldabra, Chagos, the Mascarene Basin and Tanzania; and along Japan.

References

 Sheppard, A (1984). The molluscan fauna of Chagos (Indian Ocean) and an analysis of its broad distribution patterns. Coral Reefs 3: 43–50.
 Spry, J.F. (1961). The sea shells of Dar es Salaam: Gastropods. Tanganyika Notes and Records 56
 Drivas, J. & M. Jay (1988). Coquillages de La Réunion et de l'île Maurice

External links
 

spinosa
Gastropods described in 1853